SNCF's X 4900 is a diesel multiple unit railroad car of the Caravelle family.

They are derived from the two-car X 4630 DMU with which they share the same Saurer  engines as well as their hydraulic gear box.

Aesthetics are different from the other Caravelles as the painting scheme chosen is English blue, white and grey. Interiors were designed with care and benches ignored in favour of individual seats.

The class was first allocated at Marseille-Blancarde engine shed, this led to the replacement of the X 2400 and X 2800 in the region. Their superior power led to their allocation to passenger service duties on steep gradient routes in the Southern Alps. The other members of the class were allocated to Sotteville-lès-Rouen engine shed.

The 4900s in Normandy ran coupled to X 4500 and X 4750 around Caen, Rouen, and Le Mans and as far as Rennes and Tours. The Southern 4900s joined the Norman railcars upon the arrival of the BB 67400 at Marseille. Despite the arrival in Normandy of the X 72500 and particularly of the X 73500, the 4900 have been taken out of service but in fact have kept to their regular schedule. The X 76500 delivered in 2004 will run between Caen and Rouen along the 4900s.

The three trains belonging to Basse-Normandie received an extensive servicing at the beginning of the 2000s and kept their original livery. The 10 trains belonging to Haute-Normandie received the TER as well as a modernised cab, identical to that of the X 4630 renovated DMUs. Thanks to their reliability, the X 4900 will be kept for another fifteen years, unlike the X 4300 and X 4500 which will be retired.

Inventory
2006 list of railcars of the X4900 class.

References 

4900
Diesel multiple units of France
Train-related introductions in 1975